KGCL (90.9 FM) is a radio station  broadcasting the Spanish Christian radio network Radio Nueva Vida. Licensed to Jordan Valley, Oregon, United States, the station serves the Boise area.  The station is currently owned by Educational Media Foundation.

History
The station was assigned the call letters KARO on 25 June 2002. On 27 March 2003, the station changed its call sign to KIDH, and on 24 September 2008 to the current KGCL.

From 2008 to 2010 KGCL aired a Southern Gospel and Positive Country format, carrying the programming of God's Country Radio Network.

References

External links

GCL
Malheur County, Oregon
2002 establishments in Oregon
Educational Media Foundation radio stations